The 2016 Campeonato Nacional Clausura Scotiabank  was the 98th Chilean League top flight, in which Universidad Católica won its 11th league title.

Scores

Standings

Liguilla Pre-Copa Sudamericana
Following the conclusion of the regular season, the teams placed 2nd to 5th qualify for the Liguilla in order to determine the "Chile 2" spot to the 2016 Copa Sudamericana. However, teams that already played the 2016 Copa Libertadores (from second stage onwards) and both finalists of Copa Chile are ineligible to compete in the Liguilla. These teams are the following:
 Colo-Colo (2nd), played in Copa Libertadores. Despite having qualified for Copa Sudamericana as being runners-up of Copa Chile, their spot was removed and given to a team in the aggregate table, as a team cannot qualify for two international tournaments in a calendar year.
 Palestino (4th), already qualified for the Copa Sudamericana through the aggregate table.
 Universidad de Concepción (5th), already qualified for the Copa Sudamericana through the aggregate table.

Semifinals

O'Higgins won 3–2 on aggregate.

0–0 on aggregate. Santiago Wanderers won 4–3 on penalties.

Final

O'Higgins won 1–0 on aggregate and qualified for the 2016 Copa Sudamericana.

See also
2015–16 Campeonato Nacional season

References

External links
ANFP 

2015–16 Campeonato Nacional season
2015–16 in Chilean football
2016 in South American football leagues
Primera División de Chile seasons